is one of the seven wards of Fukuoka in Japan. As of 1 March 2012, it has a population of 296,576, with 136,133 households and an area of 66.68 km2. Its name literally means "east ward".

Kashii is in this ward. It is south of neighbouring Shingū, Fukuoka. The Shika Island is connected to Umi no Nakamichi by a bridge.

The annual Fukuoka International Cross Country meeting takes place in this ward.

Places within Higashi-ku
 Maidashi

Education

Colleges and universities
 Kyushu University - Maidashi campus (Kyushu University Academic Medical Center), Hakozaki campus
Fukuoka Institute of Technology

Primary and secondary schools

The ward has a North Korean school, Fukuoka Korean Elementary School (福岡朝鮮初級学校).

Parks
There are approximately 400 public parks in Higashi-ku. Set in Fukuoka's greenbelt, the park was built on land formerly occupied by the Nishitetsu Miyajidake Line, which was sold to the city in 1980.

Facilities

Commerce 
Island City, Fukuoka
Island Tower Sky Club
Marine World Uminonakamichi

Religion 
Buddhism
Honbutsu-ji (Nichiren Shōshū)
Christianity
Hakozaki Catholic Church 
Islam
Fukuoka Mosque
Shinto
Hakozaki Shrine
Kashii-gū

See also
Coca-Cola Red Sparks

References

External links

  

Wards of Fukuoka